Sima Jinlong (after 420-484), courtesy name Rongze (榮則), was a Han–Xianbei prince and general of the Xianbei-led Northern Wei dynasty of China, whose tomb was discovered in the village of Shijia, Datong, Shanxi.

Sima Jinlong was of mixed Han and Xianbei heritage: he was the son of the Eastern Jin prince Sima Chuzhi (司馬楚之), who had become a refugee at the court of the Northern Wei dynasty when the Eastern Jin dynasty collapsed in 420, and his mother was a Northern Wei princess. After 420, Sima Chuzhi served as a general in the northern Wei army until his death when he was buried in the imperial tomb enclosure. Sima Jinlong spent his whole life among the Northern Wei, and married the daughter of the Northern Liang ruler Juqu Mujian. His son Sima Huilang lived among the Wei with full honors, as an officer in the army, but his actual role seems to have been minor compared to his father, as he his only mentioned briefly after his father in official chronicles, such as the Book of Wei (37) Bei Shi (29).

His tomb, of an impressive size, is dated to 484 CE and was found in the Northern Wei capital. The bodies of the deceased had been placed on an elaborately carved stone couch. Many terra-cotta funerary figures were found in the tomb, which are characteristic of the Northern Wei. They represent the progressive absorption of Han influences into the artistic productions of the Xianbei people under the rule of the Tuoba imperial clan.

See also
 Description of the panels (Chinese): 彩绘人物故事漆屏

References

Buildings and structures completed in the 5th century
Archaeological discoveries in China
Northern Wei
Tombs in China